Northside High School is one of five high schools in Roanoke County, Virginia.

Location and history
Northside High School (NHS), located in the northern area of Roanoke County, Virginia, first opened its doors to students in December 1960. Initially the student body consisted of grades seven through ten and pulled students from portions of those classes at William Byrd High School in Vinton and the former Andrew Lewis High School in Salem. NHS had no junior or senior classes its first year, so as to allow those students to graduate with the peers with which they had spent their scholastic careers. Two years later, in 1962, the first graduating class began the school year, and the entire student body consisted of grades eight through twelve. The first seniors from NHS received their diplomas in the spring of 1963.

When Northside Intermediate School opened in 1970, the rising Northside eighth graders were sent there, leaving the high school with grades nine through twelve. In 1973, the rising ninth grade class remained at the intermediate school (forming Northside Junior High School), and NHS became a senior high school. In the fall of 1994, the junior high returned to the middle school paradigm, becoming Northside Middle School (NMS), and NHS switched back to its current format, containing grades nine through twelve.

In 1977, Roanoke City annexed a portion of North Roanoke County, which resulted in a reduction in NHS’s enrollment. Since then, as a result of natural fluctuations in population as well as building new schools and redistricting, the student population has remained fairly stable at each grade level, with a graduating class of around 240 to 270. Today students from Glen Cove, Burlington, and Mountain View elementary schools attend Northside Middle School prior to coming to NHS. In 2007, Northside began renovations, which completed in the summer of 2009, to bring it onto a par with Hidden Valley High School, the newest school in the school district. NHS is situated on a campus that also contains Northside Middle School, as well as a football stadium (Hickam Field in Viking Stadium), baseball stadium, softball complex, and new, modern gymnasium.

Athletics
Northside High School is a member of the Virginia High School League and competes in the AAA Blue Ridge District, a district in Region III of Group AA. Northside formerly competed in the Group AAA Roanoke Valley District but dropped down to the Group AA Blue Ridge District in 1988. Northside won the 1995 Group AA state championship in Golf. However, the Vikings have been state runners-up two times in men's basketball and twice in women's basketball and wrestling. The Vikings also won three "unclassified" state titles in wrestling between 1967 and 1970. Most recently, in the 2007-2008 season, the Northside Viking wrestling team won the Region III wrestling championship. This championship was the first during coach Mark Agner's time as head coach. The NHS Baseball team appeared in the VHSL State Final Four in baseball in the years of 2006 and 2007. The school's track team has produced many outstanding athletes including many nationally ranked runners, most notably Catherine White, a record 15-time VHSL state champion.  Recently, the Northside High School golf team finished third at the VHSL State Tournament in Bluefield, VA. Northside High School boys' soccer team made their second state final four appearance in 2007 and won the district title in 2006 and 2007. They then in 2018 and 2019 went on to win district championship and regional championship, and making it the furthest any boys soccer team has gone to the state final. The girls' soccer team won the district title in 2005 and 2006. In 2008, Northside High School became the first team in AA Blue Ridge District to use Nike uniforms based on the uniforms of the Oregon Ducks. Northside's football team won its first state championship on 12-12-2009, defeating Bruton High School 20-17. This is also notable as it is the first football championship for any high school currently in Roanoke County and the first football championship since the VHSL established playoffs. This was also the first time since 1995 that Northside won a state championship. It was also the first appearance by a Roanoke County school in the championship game since Andrew Lewis lost to T.C. Williams in 1971, a game that has become famous for being portrayed in the 2000 movie "Remember the Titans." In addition, Northside won its first Softball State title in 2010, and won its first Baseball State title in 2011. The Vikings went on a run, beating former state champion teams such as Jefferson Forest, Turner Ashby, Cave Spring, York, and Tunstall. Northside Vikings baseball team beat Tunstall in the State finals 4-0. Northside also won state championships in indoor and outdoor track for the 4x2(indoor) 4x1 and 4x4 (Outdoor) in the year 2012-2013. The Vikings most recent AAA State Championship was won in the 2014 season.  The football team beat James Monroe High School at Liberty University on December 14, 2013, by a final score of 24 to 10.  The Vikings had a 14-1 season the way to the State Championship.

Burt Torrence, the former head football coach, was involved with the Fellowship of Christian Athletes (FCA) and has allowed that organization to visit team practices. In an FCA activity referred to as the "Watermelon Ministry," the organization visits public high school student athletes at team practices to offer watermelon slices and tell players that all the talents they have come from God. Torrence has explained that he "remembers vividly the FCA being an integral part of our school system . . . especially here in Roanoke, Virginia." In September 2015, Roanoke and Roanoke County Virginia public schools said they have ended the practice and talked with coaches and staff about what is allowed.

Burt Torrence ended his coaching stint at Northside High School when he was indicted by the Roanoke County Grand Jury for embezzlement. He admitted to accepting a stipend to work as a Track coach. He was not involved with the track team, so the funds were going directly to Torrence.

Extracurricular activities
Northside High School is also home to the Northside Vocal Music Department and The Pride of Northside Marching, under the direction of Tim Galyen. The Vocal Music Department is under the direction of Ashley Galyen. They also have the Viking Playhouse, which features a two-show season; a one-act in the fall, and either a two-act play or musical in the spring.

Notable alumni 
 Daniel Pereira, soccer player
 Carolyn Bourdeaux,  U.S. Representative from Georgia's 7th congressional district since 2021

References

Further reading

External links
School homepage
Great Schools site
Virginia Department of Education Report Card
1992 O.M. Long-Term Problems

Citations

Public high schools in Virginia
Schools in Roanoke County, Virginia
Educational institutions established in 1960
1960 establishments in Virginia